Rowell is a surname. Notable people with the surname include:

Bama Rowell (1916–1993), second baseman and outfielder  for the Boston Bees/Boston Braves and Philadelphia Phillies
Dr. Chester A. Rowell (1844–1912), physician, founder of the Fresno Republican newspaper, three time California State Senator, and University of California Regent (1891–1912). Brother of Jonathan H. Rowell. 

Chester Harvey Rowell (1867–1948). In 1898 became the editor and then manager of the Fresno Morning Republican lasting for 22 years. Son of Jonathan H. Rowell and nephew of Dr. Chester A. Rowell 
Fred Rowell (1918–1988), English footballer
Galen Rowell (1940–2002), noted wilderness photographer and climber
Gary Rowell (born 1957), English football commentator and former football player
Geoffrey Rowell (1943–2017), Anglican cleric, third Bishop of Gibraltar in Europe
George P. Rowell (1838-1908), American advertising executive and publisher
Jack Rowell (born 1937), former Director of Rugby at Bath Rugby in England
James Rowell (1851–1941), English-born Australian politician
John Samuel Rowell (1825–1907), Wisconsin pioneer inventor and manufacturer of farm machinery
Jonathan H. Rowell (February 10, 1833 – May 15, 1908), U.S. Representative from Illinois
Jonny Rowell (born 1989), English footballer
Marc Rowell (born 1938), former Australian politician
Milo Rowell (1903–1977), American lawyer and Army officer best known for his role in drafting the Constitution of Japan
Newton Rowell (1867–1941), Canadian lawyer, politician, and leading lay figure in the Methodist church
Roger de Rowell, English medieval university chancellor
Ross E. Rowell (1884–1947), United States Marine Corps aviator
Sarah Rowell (born 1962), British long-distance runner
Sydney Rowell (1894–1975), Australian soldier who served as Chief of the General Staff
Ted Rowell (footballer) (c. 1877 – c. 1967), Australian Rules footballer in the Victorian Football League
Theodore H. Rowell (1905–1979), Minnesota pharmaceutical industrialist and politician
Victoria Rowell (born 1960), American actress
William Rowell (1869–1916), English cricketer and rugby union player

See also
David Rowell & Co. British civil engineering contractor particularly noted for small suspension bridges
Rowell-Sirois Commission, Canadian Royal Commission looking into the Canadian economy and federal-provincial relations from 1937-1940
Rowell Laboratories, Inc. pharmaceutical manufacturing company founded in 1935 in Baudette, Minnesota
Rowell's syndrome, cutaneous condition, a form of cutaneous lupus erythematosus
, destroyer escort acquired by the United States Navy during World War II

English-language surnames